The Kholpetua River (Kholpatua River) is located in southwestern Bangladesh. It is one of the large rivers of the Ganges-Padma system. It is a major river of Assasuni Upazila and Shyamnagar Upazila of Satkhira District in Khulna Division.

References

Rivers of Bangladesh
Rivers of Khulna Division